Richard Bernard Lemieux (born April 19, 1951) is a Canadian former professional ice hockey player who played 274 games in the National Hockey League and 33 games in the World Hockey Association.  He played for the Kansas City Scouts, Vancouver Canucks, Atlanta Flames, and Calgary Cowboys.

Career statistics

Regular season and playoffs

External links

1951 births
Living people
Atlanta Flames players
Calgary Cowboys players
Canadian ice hockey centres
Kansas City Scouts players
Montreal Junior Canadiens players
Nova Scotia Voyageurs players
People from Abitibi-Témiscamingue
Rochester Americans players
Vancouver Canucks draft picks
Vancouver Canucks players